Košarkaški klub Trogir is a professional basketball club based in Trogir, Croatia. It competes in the A-2 Liga - South.

External links
Official Website

Basketball teams in Croatia
Basketball teams established in 1984
KK
Basketball teams in Yugoslavia